Ellembelle is a small town and is the capital of Ellembelle district, a district in the Western Region of Ghana.

References

Populated places in the Western Region (Ghana)